The year 1837 in architecture involved some significant events.

Events
 January 11 – The Royal Institute of British Architects in London (RIBA) is granted its royal charter.
 January 20 – Death of English neo-classical architect Sir John Soane gives effect to the creation of his London house as Sir John Soane's Museum.

Buildings and structures

Buildings

 June 10 – Galerie des Batailles at the Palace of Versailles in France, designed by Pierre-François-Léonard Fontaine with Frédéric Nepveu, is opened.
 July 13 – Christ Church, St Pancras, London, designed by James Pennethorne, is consecrated.
 July 20 – Euston railway station, the first main line station in London, is opened, incorporating the Euston Arch designed by Philip Hardwick (demolished 1961).
 "Great Stove" or Conservatory at Chatsworth House in England, designed by Joseph Paxton, is begun; it is the largest glass building in the world at this time (demolished 1923).
 Major reconstruction of Penrhyn Castle in North Wales by Thomas Hopper is largely completed.
 Rock Park, Rock Ferry, England, laid out by Jonathan Bennison.

Awards
 Grand Prix de Rome, architecture: Jean-Baptiste Guenepin.

Births

 28 May – George Ashlin, Irish architect (died 1921)
 4 June – Jean-Louis Pascal, French architect (died 1920)
 11 December – Webster Paulson, English civil engineer (died 1887)
 15 December – George B. Post, American architect (died 1913)

Deaths
 January 20 – Sir John Soane, English architect (born 1753)

References

Architecture
Years in architecture
19th-century architecture